The United States Virgin Islands have no natural lake-like bodies of water. The islands have very few freshwater resources. The U.S. virgin Islands is made up of 4 large islands and about 50 smaller islands. The large islands are: St. Croix, St. Thomas, St. John and Water Island.

The Virgin Islands rely on ocean water desalination to supply fresh water to residents and tourists. In addition all hotels collect rain water on their rooftops. *There are no large rivers or reservoirs in the Virgin Islands.

Lakes and ponds

Altona Lagoon
Flamingo Pond
Fredensborg Pond
Great Pond
Southgate Pond
Southside Pond

See also
List of rivers of the United States Virgin Islands

References

Bodies of water of the United States Virgin Islands
United States Virgin Islands
lakes
Virgin Islands